Thirty-two forms of Ganesha are mentioned frequently in devotional literature related to the Hindu god Ganesha (Ganapati). The Ganesha-centric scripture Mudgala Purana is the first to list them.

Detailed descriptions are included in the Shivanidhi portion of the 19th-century Kannada Sritattvanidhi. There are also sculptural representations of these thirty-two forms in the temples at Nanjangud and Chāmarājanagar (both in Mysore district, Karnataka), done about the same time as the paintings were done and also at the direction of the same monarch.  Each of the thirty-two illustrations is accompanied by a short Sanskrit meditation verse, written in Kannada script.  The meditation verses list the attributes of each form.  The text says that these meditation forms are from the Mudgala Purana.

In his review of how the iconographic forms of Ganapati shown in the Sritattvanidhi compare with those known from other sources, Martin-Dubost notes that the Sritattvanidhi is a recent text from South India, and while it includes many of Ganesha's forms that were known at that time in that area it does not describe earlier two-armed forms that existed from the 4th century, nor those with fourteen and twenty arms that appeared in Central India in the 9th and 10th centuries.

Ramachandra Rao says that:

List

Notes

References

 

 Contains color plate reproductions of the 32 Ganapati forms reproduced from the Sri Tattvanidhi.

Forms of Ganesha